Perce may refer to:

 Percé, Quebec, Canada, a city
 Percé station, a closed Via Rail station
 Perce Blackborow (1896–1949), Welsh sailor, a stowaway on Ernest Shackleton's ill-fated Imperial Trans-Antarctic Expedition
 John Percy Perce Horne (1890–1990), Australian rugby league footballer
 Percival Perce Pearce (1899–1955), American producer, director and writer
 Percival Perce Pritchard (1926-2012), Australian rugby league player

See also
 Percé Rock, a large rock formation in Quebec, Canada
 Perce Point, a headland on Alexander Island, Antarctica

Masculine given names
Hypocorisms